Brookula tenuilirata is an extinct species of sea snail, a marine gastropod mollusk, unassigned in the superfamily Seguenzioidea.

References

tenuilirata
Taxa named by Harold John Finlay